Horace Townsend Fleming was the Dean of Cloyne from 1884 to 1909.

He was educated at Trinity College, Dublin; and ordained in 1850. After  curacies in Aughnacloy  and Glanmire he held incumbencies in Cork, Kilnagross and  Ballymoney until his appointment as Dean.

References

Alumni of Trinity College Dublin
Irish Anglicans
Deans of Cloyne